The Appalachian State Mountaineers women's basketball team is the college basketball team at Appalachian State University in Boone, North Carolina. The Mountaineers compete in the Sun Belt Conference. They are currently a Division I member of the National Collegiate Athletic Association (NCAA). Appalachian State plays their home games at the George M. Holmes Convocation Center.

History
The Mountaineers began play in 1970. They formerly played in the Southern Conference until 2014. As of the end of the 2015-16 season, they have an all-time record of 607-623. They have been to the NCAA Tournament four times, losing each time in the First Round. They have appeared in the NWIT/WNIT in 1987, 2011, 2012, and 2013, going 2-6 in eight games. They played in the 2010 and 2019 WBIs, winning both championships.

Postseason results

NCAA tournament results

WNIT Tournament results

WBI Tournament results

References

External links